Murdo is a city in and county seat of Jones County, South Dakota, United States. The population was 475 at the 2020 census.

History
Murdo was founded in about 1907 by the Chicago, Milwaukee, St. Paul and Pacific Railroad. As about halfway between Rapid City and Mitchell, Murdo was home to a roundhouse and a railyard, and a passenger station which served trains bound for Rapid City and Mitchell, until the discontinuation of the Sioux passenger train. The town was named in honor of cattle baron Murdo MacKenzie.  United States Senator John Thune is from Murdo, South Dakota.

Geography
Murdo is located at  (43.888173, -100.711109).

Murdo has been assigned the ZIP code 57559 and the FIPS place code 44260.

Climate
Murdo has a humid continental climate (Koppen Dfa), with cold winters and hot summers.

Demographics

2010 census
As of the census of 2010, there were 488 people, 237 households, and 128 families living in the city. The racial makeup of the city was 93.9% White, 0.2% African American, 3.5% Native American, and 2.5% from two or more races. Hispanic or Latino of any race were 0.8% of the population.

There were 237 households, of which 26.6% had children under the age of 18 living with them, 43.0% were married couples living together, 7.6% had a female householder with no husband present, 3.4% had a male householder with no wife present, and 46.0% were non-families. 43.0% of all households were made up of individuals, and 21.5% had someone living alone who was 65 years of age or older. The average household size was 2.06 and the average family size was 2.84.

The median age in the city was 45.1 years. 21.9% of residents were under the age of 18; 6.7% were between the ages of 18 and 24; 21.1% were from 25 to 44; 29.4% were from 45 to 64; and 20.7% were 65 years of age or older. The gender makeup of the city was 47.1% male and 52.9% female.

2000 census
As of the 2000 census, there were 612 people, 271 households, and 160 families living in the city. The population density was 964.5 per square mile (375.1/km2). There were 315 housing units at an average density of 496.4 per square mile (193.1/km2). The racial makeup of the city was 95.92% White, 2.94% Native American, and 1.14% from two or more races. Hispanic or Latino of any race were 0.49% of the population.

There were 271 households, of which 28.0% had children under the age of 18 living with them, 44.6% were married couples living together, 11.4% had a female householder with no husband present, and 40.6% were non-families. 37.6% of all households were made up of individuals, and 19.2% had someone living alone who was 65 years of age or older. The average household size was 2.26 and the average family size was 2.99.

Age distribution was 26.8% under the age of 18, 6.9% from 18 to 24, 25.2% from 25 to 44, 21.9% from 45 to 64, and 19.3% who were 65 years of age or older. The median age was 40 years. For every 100 females, there were 94.9 males. For every 100 females age 18 and over, there were 85.9 males.

The median household income was $30,104, and the median family income was $40,000. Males had a median income of $24,196 versus $17,917 for females. The per capita income for the city was $16,008. About 10.5% of families and 12.1% of the population were below the poverty line, including 15.3% of those under age 18 and 11.1% of those age 65 or over.

See also
 List of cities in South Dakota

References

External links

Cities in South Dakota
Cities in Jones County, South Dakota
County seats in South Dakota
Populated places established in 1907
1907 establishments in South Dakota